Bolder is an English surname. Notable people with the surname include:

Adam Bolder (born 1980), English footballer
Bob Bolder (born 1958), English footballer
Chris Bolder (born 1982), English footballer
Linda Bolder (born 1988), Israeli-Dutch Olympic judoka
Robert Bolder (1859–1937), English film actor
Trevor Bolder (1950–2013), English rock bass guitarist

See also 
 Bould (surname)
 Boulder (disambiguation)